In enzymology, a 2-oxoglutarate carboxylase is an enzyme that catalyzes the chemical reaction

ATP + 2-oxoglutarate + HCO3-  ADP + phosphate + oxalosuccinate

The 3 substrates of this enzyme are ATP, 2-oxoglutarate, and HCO3-, whereas its 3 products are ADP, phosphate, and oxalosuccinate.

This enzyme belongs to the family of ligases, specifically those forming carbon-carbon bonds.  The systematic name of this enzyme class is '''. Other names in common use include oxalosuccinate synthetase, carboxylating factor for ICDH (incorrect), CFI, and OGC'''.

References

 
 

EC 6.4.1
Enzymes of unknown structure